Muzaffar Ahmed Chowdhury (23 November 1922 – 17 January 1978) was a Bangladeshi academic. He served as the 13th vice-chancellor of the University of Dhaka. He was appointed the Minister of Education of the Government of Bangladesh for two terms.

Education and career
Chowdhury passed the matriculation examination from Farashganj High School in Noakhali in 1938 and the intermediate examination from Feni College in 1940. And then he earned his bachelor's and master's in political science from the University of Dhaka in 1943 and 1944 respectively. In 1960, he obtained his Ph.D. degree from the University of London.

In 1945, Chowdhury joined the University of Dhaka as a lecturer in political science. He served as the proctor of the university during 1950–1952. He went on to become reader in 1961 and professor in 1969. He served as the vice-chancellor of Dhaka University from January 1972 until April 1973. He was then appointed the chairman of the University Grants Commission.

Chowdhury was a representative of Pakistan to the general assembly of the United Nations Organization (UNO) from November 1956 to February 1957.

Political career
Chowdhury was the political adviser to Sheikh Mujibur Rahman from February 1969 to March 1971. He served as the Minister of Education in two separate cabinets. In 1975, he joined the Bangladesh Krishak Sramik Awami League (BAKSAL) and was appointed as a member of its executive committee.

Works
Chowdhury has published several books including the following.

 The Civil Service in Pakistan (1963)
 Constitutional Problems of Pakistan, An Examination of the Criticisms against Bureaucracy (1964)
 Government and Politics in Pakistan (1968)
 The Political Systems of Modern States, England, USA, France, USSR and Germany, Rural Government in East Pakistan (1969)

References

1922 births
1978 deaths
People from Noakhali District
University of Dhaka alumni
Academic staff of the University of Dhaka
Alumni of the University of London
Vice-Chancellors of the University of Dhaka
Education ministers of Bangladesh
Bangladesh Krishak Sramik Awami League executive committee members
Bangladesh Krishak Sramik Awami League central committee members